The Kelud (sometimes spelled as Klut, Cloot, Kloet, Kloete, Keloed or Kelut) is an active stratovolcano located in Kediri, East Java, Indonesia. Like many Indonesian volcanoes and others on the Pacific Ring of Fire, Kelud is known for large explosive eruptions throughout its history. More than 30 eruptions have occurred since 1000 AD. In 2007, an effusive explosion filled the crater with a lava dome. The crater filled with water during the rainy season.

1334 eruption
The eruption history of Kelud is quite unique in Indonesian history, because it was one of the few volcanoes whose activities were recorded in Indonesian historical accounts. According to Nagarakretagama canto 1 stanza 4 and 5 (composed by Mpu Prapanca in 1365), King Hayam Wuruk of Majapahit was born in 1256 Saka, which corresponds to 1334 CE, the same year that Mount Kelud erupted. Prapanca argued that this was the divine sign that Batara Gurunata has manifest Himself on earth, reincarnated as the Javanese king. This account also describes the local Javanese psyche at that time (and even up to present) that regarded the natural event such as volcanic eruption, as the divine sign from the gods.

1586 eruption
In the year 1586 the worst eruption of mount Kelud killed over 10,000 people.

1919 mudflow

On May 19, 1919, an eruption at Kelud killed an estimated 5,000 people, mostly through hot mudflows (also known as "lahars"). More recent eruptions in 1951, 1966, and 1990 have altogether killed another 250 people. Following the 1966 eruption, the Ampera Tunnels were built (top and bottom) on the southwestern side of the crater to reduce (not drain completely) the water of the crater lake and thus reduce the lahar hazard.

1990 eruption
A strong and explosive eruption on early February 1990 produced a seven-kilometer-high column of tephra, heavy tephra falls and several pyroclastic flows. More than thirty people were killed.

2007 eruption
On 16 October 2007, Indonesian authorities ordered the evacuation of 30,000 residents living near Kelud, after scientists placed the volcano on the highest alert level, meaning that they expected an imminent eruption.

Kelud erupted at about 3 p.m. local time on Saturday, 3 November 2007. The eruption was confirmed by the Indonesian government's Centre for Vulcanology and Geological Hazard Mitigation. Although no visual confirmation was possible when the eruption began because the volcano's peak was shrouded by clouds, Indonesian government volcanologists said seismic readings showed an eruption was under way. More than 350,000 people lived within  of the volcano. Although local inhabitants were ordered to leave their homes in mid-October, many either did not evacuate or returned in the interim. Many villagers were reported fleeing the area in panic after reports of the eruption. But by early Saturday evening, Indonesian officials said the eruption that day had not been very large at all. Seismological equipment near the volcano's crater was still operating, and scientists said that indicated a small eruption at best.

However, early Sunday morning, 4 November, Mount Kelud spewed ash  into the air, indicating a full eruption was taking place. "The eruption isn't over," Saut Simatupang, head of Indonesian Volcanology and Geological Hazard Mitigation Agency, said.

On 5 November, new columns of smoke and steam erupted from the crater. Boiling water cascaded down the flanks of the mountain from the crater lake, and seismological equipment near the crater ceased working. Indonesian authorities said about 25,000 people remained in the danger zone, ignoring evacuation orders.

The following day, a lava dome rose through the centre of the crater lake atop the mountain. The volcano continued to emit smoke, with plumes reaching  into the atmosphere.

But after 48 hours of smoke and ash but no lava, Indonesian officials declared on 8 November that no eruption was immediate. Officials said the volcano was experiencing a "slow eruption" and was unlikely to explode as it had done many times in the past century.

By 12 November, Mount Kelud began spewing lava into its crater lake. Smoke rose more than  into the air, and ash dusted several villages around the volcano.
The hot lava dome occupied the lake crater and, consequently, the lake disappeared.

2014 eruption

Kelud erupted on 13 February 2014. The eruption occurred at 22:50 local time (UT+7). Ashfall occurred over a large portion of Java island, from Malang to the west, as well as Central Java and Yogyakarta. The eruption prompted about 76,000 inhabitants to evacuate their homes. Two people were reported dead after their houses collapsed from the weight of ash. An elderly man also died from inhaling the ash. The ash also reportedly reached the western region of Java by February 14 afternoon, where traces of volcanic ash were found in Bandung and surroundings.

Ashfall from the eruption caused major disruption across Java. Seven airports, in Yogyakarta, Surakarta, Surabaya, Malang, Semarang, Cilacap and Bandung, were closed. Financial losses from the airport closures were valued in the billions of rupiah (millions of US dollars), including an estimated 2 billion rupiah (US$200,000) at Juanda International Airport in Surabaya. Significant damage was caused to a variety of manufacturing and agricultural industries. The ashfall meant companies such as Unilever Indonesia had difficulty distributing their products throughout affected areas. Apple orchards in Batu, East Java, posted losses of up to Rp 17.8 billion, while the dairy industry in the province posted high losses.

On 14 February 2014, major tourist attractions in Yogyakarta and Central Java, including Borobudur, Prambanan and Ratu Boko, were closed to visitors, after being severely affected by the volcanic ashfall from the eruption of Kelud volcano a day earlier, in East Java, located around 200 kilometers east from Yogyakarta. Workers covered the iconic stupas and statues of Borobudur temple to protect the structure from volcanic ash. Owing to the ash, many tourists cancelled their reservations at hotels throughout Central Java. Tempo reported that hotels in Yogyakarta had posted losses of Rp 22 billion (US$2.2 million) as more than 80 percent of reservations were canceled owing to the ash.

Flow-up following the eruptions had begun by 15 February. Indonesian military personnel used water cannons to clear roads, and were later involved in reconstruction efforts in the areas surrounding Kelud. Citizens did likewise, although with less powerful equipment. Political parties vying for the April elections helped distribute food to victims of the eruptions. By February 20 most businesses and attractions which had closed owing to the ashfall had reopened, although cleaning operations were still ongoing.

By early March most of the 12,304 buildings destroyed or damaged during the eruptions had been repaired, at an estimated cost of Rp 55 billion (US$5.5 million).

See also
 List of volcanoes in Indonesia
 List of volcanic eruptions by death toll

Bibliography
Notes

References

 - Total pages: 733

Further reading
 Brand, E.W. (1984) "Landslides in Southeast Asia: A State-of-the-Art Report." In IV International Symposium on Landslides = IV Symposium international sur les glissements de terrains. Toronto: Canadian Geotechnical Society, 1984. OCLC 77114072.
 Van Bemmelen, R.W. The Geology of Indonesia. Vol. 1A: General Geology of Indonesia and Adjacent Archipelagoes. 2nd ed. The Hague: Martinus Nijhoff, 1987. .
 Zen, M.T., and Hadikusumo, Djajadi. "The Future Danger of Mt. Kelut." Bulletin of Volcanology. 28:1 (December 1965).

External links

 Kelud crater lake
 Photos of the Kelud volcanic dome
 CIMSS Satellite Blog, Eruption of the Kelut volcano in Java, Indonesia. February 13th, 2014

Mountains of East Java
Volcanoes of East Java
Active volcanoes of Indonesia
Volcanic crater lakes
Blitar
20th-century volcanic events
21st-century volcanic events
1919 natural disasters
1990 natural disasters
2007 natural disasters
2014 natural disasters
1919 disasters in Asia
1990 disasters in Indonesia
2007 disasters in Indonesia
2014 disasters in Indonesia